The Lower Kaleköy Dam, also known as the Aşağı Kaleköy Dam, is a gravity dam planned on the Murat River in Genç district of Bingöl Province, eastern Turkey. Its primary purpose is hydroelectric power generation and it will support a 500 MW hydroelectric power station. It is owned by Kalehan Energy Generation.

See also

Upper Kaleköy Dam – under construction upstream
Beyhan I Dam – downstream

References

Dams in Bingöl Province
Dams on the Murat River
Roller-compacted concrete dams
Hydroelectric power stations in Turkey
Gravity dams